Parque da Cidade is a district of the Portuguese city of Póvoa de Varzim. It literally means City Park, as it is where the city's park is located and occupies most of the land area. This part of the city is set in four distinct parishes: Amorim, Aver-o-Mar, Beiriz, and Póvoa de Varzim Parish and is located northeast of the city center. The residential areas of the district are located west and North of the park.

The Clipovoa, the city's private hospital, the main private school, the city stadium are located in Parque da Cidade. It is planned that the Varzim S.C. stadium and the Sports Complex of C.D. Póvoa will be relocated to this district.

References

Neighbourhoods of Póvoa de Varzim